Area code 767 is the local telephone area code of the Commonwealth of Dominica, within the North American Numbering Plan. Area 767 was created with the start of permissive dialing on 1 October 1997, ending 30 September 1998, as a split from area 809, which formerly covered 19 Caribbean territories. The number 767 corresponds to the letters ROS and may be mnemonic for Roseau, Dominica's capital city.

See also
Area codes in the Caribbean
List of NANP area codes
North American Numbering Plan

External links
 List of exchanges from AreaCodeDownload.com, 767 Area Code

767
Communications in Dominica